Alan V. Deardorff (born 1944) is the John W. Sweetland Professor of International Economics and a Professor of Economics and Public Policy at the University of Michigan Gerald R. Ford School of Public Policy, Ann Arbor.  Deardorff received his Ph.D. in Economics from Cornell University in 1971.

Deardorff is the author of Deardorffs' Glossary of International Economics, as well as the Family Tree of Trade Economists. He has undertaken work on David Ricardo's theory of comparative advantage, arguing that "the law of comparative advantage breaks down when applied to individual commodities or pairs of commodities in a many-commodity world", but stating that "that the law is nonetheless valid if restated in terms of averages across all commodities".

Current Affiliations 
External Fellow, Leverhulme Centre for Research on Globalisation and Economic Policy, University of Nottingham.
Faculty Associate, William Davidson Institute, University of Michigan
International Research Fellow, Kiel Institute of World Economics
Member, Academic Council, VRCenter DEGIT, Institute for World Economics, Kiel University
Member, American Economic Association
Member, Board of Editors, North American Journal of Economics and Finance
Member, Editorial Advisory Board, International Economic Journal
Member, Editorial Advisory Board, The World Economy
Member, Editorial Board, Journal of Economic Integration
Member, Editorial Board, Journal of International Economic Law
Member, Editorial Board, Studies in International Economics, University of Michigan Press
Member, Group of Eminent Persons on Non-tariff Barriers, United Nations Conference on Trade and Development

References

External links 
 Alan Deardorff's website

1944 births
Living people
21st-century American economists
Cornell University alumni
Faculty
University of Michigan faculty
Gerald R. Ford School of Public Policy faculty